Never Been Kissed is a 1999 American romantic comedy film directed by Raja Gosnell and starring Drew Barrymore, Jessica Alba, David Arquette, Michael Vartan, Leelee Sobieski, Jeremy Jordan, Molly Shannon, Garry Marshall, John C. Reilly and James Franco in his film debut.

In 2020, Barrymore reprised her role from Never Been Kissed as a sketch on The Drew Barrymore Show.

Plot 
Josie Geller is an insecure 25-year-old copy editor for the Chicago Sun-Times who has never had a real relationship. One day, her editor-in-chief, Rigfort, assigns her to report undercover at a high school to help parents become more aware of their children's lives.

Her first day at South Glen South High School is miserable. Josie reverts to the old geek persona that ruined her first high school experience. She also has an unfortunate run-in with three obnoxious popular girls, Kirsten, Gibby and Kristin, and the school's most attractive and popular student, Guy Perkins. Josie loses hope but is reassured when a kind-hearted nerd named Aldys befriends her. Aldys, who loathes Guy and his gang, invites Josie to join The Denominators, a group of intelligent students.

Josie falls in love with her English teacher, Sam Coulson, and becomes the top student in his class. After reciting a romantic excerpt from Shakespeare to Sam, Josie has horrible flashbacks to when she read a romantic poem aloud in class to her high school crush, a popular boy named Billy Prince, who later asked her to their senior prom, making her dream come true. However, on the night of the prom, Billy arrives with another girl and both of them hurl eggs and insults at Josie, humiliating her and breaking her heart.

One night while out driving with Aldys, Josie encounters Guy and his gang at a local hangout called "The Court" where promiscuity and underage drinking take place. Her managing editor Augustus "Gus" Strauss loses patience with Josie after a rival paper scoops The Court story, and orders Josie to become friends with the popular kids. He arranges for her to wear a hidden camera, and soon the whole office becomes obsessed with her story.

Josie confides in her brother Rob about her fears. Rob, who was their high school's most popular boy in his teens, urges her to let go of her old self and start anew. To help her, Rob enrolls as a student and becomes an instant hit. He then uses his influence to draw Josie into the cool crowd, much to the dismay of Aldys.

Sam and Josie grow closer, but Sam struggles with his feelings as he thinks she's a student. Guy and Josie attend the prom as Rosalind and Orlando from Shakespeare's As You Like It. Anita, Gus and Josie's other co-workers watch through the camera and are overjoyed as she is voted prom queen. As Guy dances with Aldys as an alleged act of friendship, the mean girls attempt to dump dog food over Aldys. Outraged, Josie prevents the incident, throws her crown away and reveals her true identity. She praises Aldys for her kindness and warns the students that one's persona in high school means nothing in the real world. Sam is hurt by her lies and states he wants nothing to do with her. Also angered is Rob, who as a phony student received a second chance at baseball. Josie, ultimately making amends, secures him a coaching job.

Josie vows to give Gus a story and writes an account of her experience. In it, she admits she's never been kissed, describes the students of South Glen South, and avows her love for Sam; the entire city is moved by it. She writes she will stand in the middle of the baseball field with a countdown and wait for Sam to come and kiss her. Josie waits, but the clock runs out with no sign of Sam. On the verge of giving up, soft cheers from the crowd give way to a booming roar, as Sam emerges to give her a romantic kiss. The movie ends with Sam telling her it took him forever to get here, a sentiment with which Josie agrees as they kiss again.

Cast 

 Drew Barrymore as Josie Geller
 David Arquette as Rob Geller
 Michael Vartan as Sam Coulson
 Leelee Sobieski as Aldys 
 Molly Shannon as Anita
 John C. Reilly as Augustus "Gus" Strauss
 Jeremy Jordan as Guy Perkins
 Jessica Alba as Kirsten Liosis
 Jordan Ladd as Gibby Zerefski
 Marley Shelton as Kristin Davis
 Garry Marshall as Rigfort
 James Franco as Jason
 Cory Hardrict as Packer 
 Denny Kirkwood as Billy Prince
 Marissa Jaret Winokur as Sheila
 Maya McLaughlin as Lara
 Giuseppe Andrews as Denominator
 Alex Solowitz as Brett
 Octavia Spencer as Cynthia
 Branden Williams as Tommy
 Cress Williams as George
 Sean Whalen as Merkin
 Martha Hackett as Mrs. Knox
 Jenny Bicks as Miss Haskell
 Katie Lansdale as Tracy

Soundtrack 

Song appearances
 During the scene where Josie and Aldys are talking to each other on the football field, the band plays the theme song from The Simpsons.
 During a scene where Josie is remembering her bullying in high school, Cyndi Lauper's "She Bop" is played.
 "(I Just) Died in Your Arms" by Cutting Crew plays when Josie first sees Guy entering the classroom.
 American ska band Spring Heeled Jack U.S.A. submitted a song named "Josie" for the film's soundtrack. The band had previously released a single titled "Jolene" which was about their tour van, but when given the opportunity to submit a song for the soundtrack, they simply replaced the name Jolene with Josie to make it relevant to Barrymore's character in the film. It was later rejected.
 The morning after Josie's experience with marijuana, "Me Myself and I" by De La Soul is heard playing.
 When Josie is remembering her first senior prom, Madonna's song "Like a Prayer" can be heard in the background.
 The single "Lucky Denver Mint" by Jimmy Eat World is featured in the film's soundtrack, and was the only single from their album Clarity to consequently gain airplay on popular American radio.
 A significant amount of the song "Heaven Tonight" by Hole appears in the film.
 The Latin funk band Ozomatli makes a cameo.
 During the climax, in the scene when Josie receives her first kiss from Sam on the baseball field, the song "Don't Worry Baby" by The Beach Boys is played.
 While Josie and Sam are dancing, the song "Please, Please, Please, Let Me Get What I Want" by The Smiths can be heard in the background.
 The song "Erase/Rewind" by The Cardigans is played, in the background, towards the end of the movie, at the prom night when the prom king and queen dance.
 The song "Watching the Wheels" by John Lennon appears in the movie.
 Kottonmouth Kings' "Suburban Life" plays when Josie pulls up to the school and her car backfires.
 The song "Peppyrock" by BTK is featured in the movie.

Filming locations 
 Jackie Robinson Stadium was the location used for the climactic scene in which Josie waits for her first real kiss from Sam.

Reception

Box office
The film was released in North America on April 9, 1999, in 2,455 theaters. It grossed $55.5 million in the United States and Canada, and $29.1 million in other markets, for a worldwide total of $84.6 million against a production budget of $25 million.

Critical reception
Critics gave mixed reviews to the film, with a "Rotten" score of 55% on review aggregation website Rotten Tomatoes based on 89 reviews, making it Raja Gosnell's highest rated film. Its consensus reads: "Unoriginal and unremarkable high school satire adds little to the genre." Film critic Roger Ebert was not as harsh on the film, giving it 3 out of 4 stars and saying, "The movie's screenplay is contrived and not blindingly original, but Barrymore illuminates it with sunniness, and creates a lovable character."

The film has since garnered a cult following. For the 20th anniversary of its initial release on April 9, 2019, Drew Barrymore posted the following on social media:

Television series
The November 6, 2020 episode of The Drew Barrymore Show featured Barrymore in the "Drew's News" segment revive her teen character from Never Been Kissed, Josie "Grossie" Geller. Sporting her satin pink prom dress, matching scrunchie and braces, Josie stepped straight out of 1988 for the bit—with no knowledge of anything that's happened since then. Josie subsequently became a recurring sketch comedy part of the series, with Barrymore interviewing the cast of Dear Evan Hansen in-character as Josie. Barrymore once more portrayed Josie in a segment for the December 13, 2021 episode of The Drew Barrymore Show, when she interviewed Maya Erskine and Anna Konkle, who were themselves, in character as Maya Ishii-Peters and Anna Kone respectively from the TV series PEN15.

Accolades
The film is recognized by American Film Institute in these lists:
 2002: AFI's 100 Years...100 Passions – Nominated

References

External links 

 
 
 
 
 

1999 films
1999 romantic comedy films
1990s American films
1990s English-language films
1990s high school films
1990s teen comedy films
1990s teen romance films
20th Century Fox films
American high school films
American romantic comedy films
American teen comedy films
American teen romance films
Films about educators
Films about journalists
Films about pranks
Films about proms
Films directed by Raja Gosnell
Films scored by David Newman
Films set in 1989
Films set in 1999
Films set in Chicago
Films shot in Chicago
Flower Films films